Air Vice-Marshal Robert Peel Willock,  (17 December 1893 – 22 March 1973) was a senior Royal Air Force officer who commanded the British Air Forces in Iraq during the Second World War.

RAF career
Willcock was commissioned into the 9th (Reserve) Battalion of the Oxford and Buckinghamshire Light Infantry in 1914 and went on to serve as a Squadron Commander with the Royal Flying Corps during the First World War. Following his promotion to wing commander in 1928, he was appointed Station Commander at RAF Kenley in 1928 before going on to be Air Attaché in Shanghai in 1933 and Director of Staff Duties at the Air Ministry in 1938. He served in the Second World War as Air Officer Commanding No. 21 (Training) Group. He became Air Officer Commanding AHQ Iraq and Persia in 1943 and then became Head of the RAF delegation in Washington D. C. in 1944 before retiring in 1945.

In retirement, he was the Civil Aviation Adviser to the UK High Commissioner to Australia.

References

1893 births
1973 deaths
British air attachés
Commanders of the Legion of Merit
Commanders with Star of the Order of Polonia Restituta
Companions of the Order of the Bath
Oxfordshire and Buckinghamshire Light Infantry officers
Royal Air Force air marshals
Royal Air Force personnel of World War I
Royal Flying Corps officers
British Army personnel of World War I